The  by the Japanese government involved the establishment of a new ministry, the merging of existing ministries and the abolition of others. This resulted in little more than a change of ministry names (with the exception of the Environment Agency which gained ministry status — a longtime goal).

The objectives of the reform are:
 Establishing a System with More Effective Political Leadership
 Restructuring of National Administrative Organs
 More Transparent Administration
 Drastic Streamlining of the Central Government

Establishing a System with More Effective Political Leadership

Amendment of Cabinet Law 
 The government put emphasis on the principle that sovereign power resides with the people in the article 1 on amendment of the Cabinet Law.
 The number of Ministers of State has been changed to "not more than fourteen" from "not more than twenty". 
 Prime minister's authority to propose and cabinet secretary's planning and drafting function have been clarified. 
 Three Assistant Cabinet Secretaries, a Cabinet Secretary for Public Relations, and a Cabinet Secretary for Information Research have been created within the Cabinet Secretariat, replacing the posts of Chief Cabinet Councillor on Internal Affairs, Chief Cabinet Councillor on External Affairs, Director-General of the Cabinet Office for National Security Affairs and Crisis Management, Director-General of the Cabinet Public Relations Office, and Director-General of the Cabinet Information Research Office.
 The fixed number of Special Advisors has been increased from three to five; and the number of Private Secretaries currently fixed by law will be provided by Cabinet order. 
 Opening the Cabinet Secretariat's posts to individuals from both inside and outside of the Government.

Establishment of the Cabinet Office 
 The Chief Cabinet Secretary and Ministers for Special Missions directly assist the Prime Minister. The three State Secretary posts and three Parliamentary Secretary posts have been installed in the Office.
 The Prime Minister will be able to appoint the Ministers for Special Missions at his discretion, when he considers the appointment highly necessary for the cohesiveness of the policies of administrative branches. Ministers for Special Missions will always be appointed respectively for the affairs concerning Okinawa and Northern policies, and those under the jurisdiction of the Financial Services Agency. 
 Director-General-level positions for special missions have been introduced in the Cabinet Office.
 The Councils on important policies are set up within the Office to form an organ that "contributes to the planning and drafting, and comprehensive coordination needed for the integration of the policies of administrative branches."
 The National Public Safety Commission, the Defense Agency and the Financial Services Agency have been re-positioned as independent organs within the Office. Also, the Defense Facilities Administration Agency will remain in the Defense Agency.

Other 
 Reinforcement of Political Leadership by the Introduction of the State Secretary 
 Realignment and Rationalization of the Policy Councils

Restructuring of National Administrative Organs 
The administrative reform has reorganized the Ministries according to their main "purposes" in a way that they can perform as synthetic and coherent a function as possible. In order to prevent sectionalism, which has been pointed out for its detrimental effects and respond to issues flexibly and cohesively, systems of policy coordination have been constructed so that related administrative organs, in light of their purposes, hold deliberations on their inter-Ministerial measures. A system of policy evaluation has been introduced for the government itself to evaluate the effects of its policies before and after implementation, and to utilize the result of evaluation in the planning and drafting of policies.

More Transparent Administration 
Introduction of the new system of Independent Administrative Institutions is one of the core items of the administrative reform.

Drastic Streamlining of the Central Government 
 Streamlining of the Administration
 Rationalization of Undertakings by Abolishment/ Privatization, Promotion of Outsourcing, Deregulation and the Delegation to Local Governments and Reform of Government Enterprises
 Alignment of Organizations by Reduction in number of Ministers' Secretariats, Bureaus, and Divisions, Review of Affiliated Facilities and Other Organs and Realignment and Rationalization of Local Branch Offices
 Reduction in the Number of Personnel

External links
 Prime Minister's Official website
 Ministry of Foreign Affair's Official website

Politics of Post-war Japan
Government of Japan
Heisei period
Central Government Reform
Japanese governmental reforms